Wisdom of the Ages is a panel show aired on the DuMont Television Network from December 16, 1952, to June 30, 1953. The show combined the ideas of Juvenile Jury and Life Begins at Eighty, with a combined panel of youth and the elderly. Wisdom of the Ages aired Tuesdays at 9:30pm ET, and replaced Quick on the Draw which ended December 9, 1952.

The show was hosted by Jack Barry, and was a production of Barry & Enright Productions.

Episode status
An episode from June 16, 1953, survives at the UCLA Film and Television Archive.

See also
List of programs broadcast by the DuMont Television Network
List of surviving DuMont Television Network broadcasts
1952-53 United States network television schedule

References

Bibliography
David Weinstein, The Forgotten Network: DuMont and the Birth of American Television (Philadelphia: Temple University Press, 2004) 
Alex McNeil, Total Television, Fourth edition (New York: Penguin Books, 1980) 
Tim Brooks and Earle Marsh, The Complete Directory to Prime Time Network TV Shows, Third edition (New York: Ballantine Books, 1964)

External links
Wisdom of the Ages at IMDB
DuMont historical website

DuMont Television Network original programming
1952 American television series debuts
1953 American television series endings
Black-and-white American television shows
1950s American game shows